Daryia Siarheyeuna Barysevich (born 27 May 1990) is a Belarusian middle-distance runner specialising in the 1500 metres. She twice reached the final at the European Indoor Championships, in 2017 and 2019. She also finished eighth at the 2018 European Championships.

In 2019, she won the silver medal in the team event at the 2019 European Games held in Minsk, Belarus.

International competitions

Personal bests
Outdoor
800 metres – 2:01.93 (Heusden-Zolder 2016)
1000 metres – 2:39.19 (Sopot 2016)
1500 metres – 4:06.75 (Tübingen 2018)
One mile – 4:30.86 (Rovereto 2016) NR
Indoor
800 metres – 2:03.73 (Mogilyov 2017)
1000 metres – 2:38.19 (Madrid 2017)
1500 metres – 4:08.31 (Glasgow 2019)

References

1990 births
Living people
Belarusian female middle-distance runners
Athletes (track and field) at the 2019 European Games
European Games medalists in athletics
European Games silver medalists for Belarus
Athletes from Minsk